The 2001–02 Japan Figure Skating Championships were the 70th edition of the event. They were held on December 21–23, 2001 at the Namihaya Dome arena in Kadoma, Osaka. National Champions were crowned in the disciplines of men's singles, ladies' singles, pair skating, and ice dancing. As well as crowning the national champions of Japan for the 2001–02 season, the results of this competition were used to help pick the teams for the 2002 Winter Olympics, 2002 World Championships, and the 2002 Four Continents Championships.

Competition notes
 Takeshi Honda and Yoshie Onda withdrew before the competition, but had already been chosen before the event to compete at the 2002 Winter Olympics.
 The following skaters placed high enough at Junior Nationals and so were invited to compete at Nationals: Daisuke Takahashi, Ryosuke Sasaki. Makoto Nakata, and Nobunari Oda for men, Miki Ando, Yukari Nakano, Ichie Hayashi, and Akiko Suzuki for ladies.
 Despite technically qualifying by placing third, Miki Ando was not selected for the Four Continents team because she was not age-eligible. Fourth place finisher Akiko Suzuki went instead.

Results

Men

Ladies

Pairs

Ice dancing

Japan Junior Figure Skating Championships
The 2001–02 Japan Junior Figure Skating Championships took place between November 23 and 24, 2001 in Tokyo.

The following skaters placed high enough at Novice Nationals to be invited to compete here: Takahiko Kozuka (1st in novice A, 8th in junior), Aki Sawada (1st in novice A, 7th in junior), Nana Takeda (2nd in novice A, 9th in junior), Eri Ishigami (3rd in novice A, 25th in junior), and Mao Asada (1st in novice B, 6th in junior).

Men
 Entry: 26 athletes

Ladies
 Entry: 31 athletes

Ice dancing

International team selections

Winter Olympics

World Championships

Four Continents Championships

World Junior Championships
After Junior Nationals, the World Junior team was announced as follows:

External links
 2001–02 Japan Figure Skating Championships results
 2001–02 Japan Junior Figure Skating Championships results 

Japan Figure Skating Championships
2001 in figure skating
2002 in figure skating
2001 in Japanese sport